Heterosilpha is a genus of carrion beetles in the family Silphidae. There are at least two described species in Heterosilpha.

Species
These two species belong to the genus Heterosilpha:
 Heterosilpha aenescens (Casey, 1886)
 Heterosilpha ramosa (Say, 1823) (garden carrion beetle)

References

Further reading

 

Silphidae
Articles created by Qbugbot